Aleksandar Petrović (Serbian Cyrillic: Александар Петровић; born 22 March 1983), is a Serbian former professional footballer who played as a right-back.

Career
He had previously played with Serbian clubs FK Partizan, FK Teleoptik, FK Borac Čačak, FK Voždovac, FK Smederevo, and Korean K-League clubs Jeonbuk Hyundai Motors and Chunnam Dragons.

Position
He can be deployed as either a right-back, his preferred position, or as a left-wing midfield player.

Background
Petrović is often known simply by his nickname, Alex.

Honours
Jeonbuk Hyundai Motors
K League 1: 2009

External links

Early career stats at Srbijafudbal
Later career stats at Srbijafudbal
Aleksandar Petrović Stats at Utakmica.rs

Living people
1983 births
Footballers from Belgrade
Serbian footballers
Association football defenders
Serbian expatriate footballers
FK Partizan players
FK Teleoptik players
FK Čukarički players
FK Borac Čačak players
FK Voždovac players
FK Smederevo players
Jeonbuk Hyundai Motors players
Jeonnam Dragons players
FC Petrolul Ploiești players
CS Concordia Chiajna players
ACS Poli Timișoara players
CS Național Sebiș players
Serbian SuperLiga players
K League 1 players
Liga I players
Expatriate footballers in South Korea
Expatriate footballers in Romania
Serbian expatriate sportspeople in South Korea
Serbian expatriate sportspeople in Romania